Issa Ibrahim Djibrilla (born 1 January 1996) is a Nigerien professional footballer who plays for the Nigerien national team.

Club career
On 26 July 2021, Djibrilla was bought outright by the Turkish team Ankara Keçiörengücü.

International career
On 10 October 2020, Djibrilla made his debut in the national team in a friendly match against Chad in a 2 – 0 victory.

On 15 November 2021, he scored his first 2 goals for Niger against Djibouti at the 2022 FIFA World Cup qualifying match in a 7-2 victory.

References

External links
 
 

1996 births
People from Niamey
Living people
Nigerien footballers
Niger A' international footballers
Niger international footballers
Association football forwards
Sahel SC players
Rahimo FC players
Ankara Keçiörengücü S.K. footballers
TFF First League players
2020 African Nations Championship players
Nigerien expatriate footballers
Expatriate footballers in Turkey
Nigerien expatriate sportspeople in Turkey